Zaraysk is a town and the administrative center of Zaraysky District in Moscow Oblast, Russia, located about  southeast from Moscow. Population:

Geography
The town stands on the right bank of the Osyotr River, which is a right confluent of the Oka.

History
In the Middle Ages, the town belonged to the Princes of Ryazan and was known as Krasnoye (13th century) and Novogorodok-upon-the-Osyotr (14th and 15th centuries). From 1528 onwards, the town was called "the town of Nikola Zarazsky" and only by the beginning of 17th century it received its present name of Zaraysk. Before the 20th century, the town was a part of Ryazan Governorate and its architecture and vernacular dialect seem closer to Ryazan than to Moscow.

In the Grand Duchy of Moscow, Zaraysk was one of the fortresses forming a part of the Great Abatis Border, a fortified line of felled trees, barricades, fortresses, ditches, which were built by Russians as a protection against the hordes of the Crimean and Kazan Tatars. In 1531, a stone kremlin was built in place of the former wooden citadel. The Tatars failed to take the fortress during their raids in 1533, 1541, and 1570. It was briefly captured by the Lisowczycy during the Time of Troubles.

The brick-and-limestone kremlin in Zaraysk still stands and is kept in a rather good condition. The citadel is very small and has a rectangular shape, with only six towers, two of which are pierced by the gates.

Administrative and municipal status
Within the framework of administrative divisions, Zaraysk serves as the administrative center of Zaraysky District. As an administrative division, it is incorporated within Zaraysky District as the Town of Zaraysk. As a municipal division, the Town of Zaraysk is incorporated within Zaraysky Municipal District as Zaraysk Urban Settlement.

Economy
Zaraysk is an industrial center of the district, with printing, building materials, foodstuff, and footwear industries.

Sights 
The main tourist attraction is a traditional Russian citadel known as the Zaraysk Kremlin. There are five churches in Zaraysk, the oldest of which is St. Nicholas Cathedral, consecrated in 1681. The downtown also has a traditional covered market, or Gostiny Dvor.

Archaeology 
Near the kremlin wall is an Upper Paleolithic site associated with the Gravettian culture. It first attracted attention when a bison figurine dated 22000 BP was found there. By 2008, many other artefacts were found, including:
 A mammoth's rib with drawings on them which are thought to be the images of three mammoths.
 A small bone having an ornament of 'X'-shaped patterns on it.
 Two figurines of humans, presumably of women.
 A piece with a conical shape made of a mammoth's bone. The upper part of the cone has been cut, it has a hole in the centre and many patterns. The purpose of this object is not known.

Sister cities
 Popovo, Bulgaria
 Arzamas, Russia

References

Notes

Sources

Further reading
 Зарайск. Материалы для истории города XVI-XVIII столетий (Zaraysk. Materials for the History of the 16th-18th centuries (1888)). Available at Runivers.ru in DjVu and PDF formats.

External links
 Unofficial website of Zaraysk
Small Towns of Russia. Zaraysk.
 Photos of Zaraysk
Pictures of Zaraysk in 1995
Russia Beyond the Headlines. Zaraysk, the "Grandfather City"

Cities and towns in Moscow Oblast
Populated places in Zaraysky District
Zaraysky Uyezd